Dheenle is a town in the southwestern Gedo region of Somalia.

References
Dheenle

Populated places in Gedo